St. Xavier’s College, Jaipur, is a Jesuit college in the city of Jaipur in Rajasthan, India. It was established in 2010, and is a co-educational, self-financed Catholic minority institution, affiliated to the University of Rajasthan. It offers undergraduate courses in arts, science, management, computers and commerce. The college also offers Master of Arts in English and Economics and Master of Commerce in EAFM and HRM.

History

St. Xavier's College was founded in July 2010 in Jaipur

The Jesuits first came to Jaipur in 1729 at the invitation of Maharaja Sawai Jai Singh II in order to help in setting up an astronomical observatory.

See also

 List of Jesuit Educational Institutions
 List of Jesuit Sites

References

Educational institutions established in 2010
Universities and colleges in Jaipur
Jesuit universities and colleges in India
Commerce colleges in India
Arts colleges in India
2010 establishments in India